The Gabali is a rare rabbit breed which originates in Egypt. It is primarily agouti in colour and was bred as a meat breed by the Bedouins.

See also

List of rabbit breeds

References

Rabbit breeds